The borders of the oceans are the limits of Earth's oceanic waters. The definition and number of oceans can vary depending on the adopted criteria. The principal divisions (in descending order of area) of the five oceans are the Pacific Ocean, Atlantic Ocean, Indian Ocean, Southern (Antarctic) Ocean, and Arctic Ocean. Smaller regions of the oceans are called seas, gulfs, bays, straits, and other terms. Geologically, an ocean is an area of oceanic crust covered by water.

See also the list of seas article for the seas included in each ocean area.

Overview
Though generally described as several separate oceans, the world's oceanic waters constitute one global, interconnected body of salt water sometimes referred to as the World Ocean or  Global Ocean. This concept of a continuous body of water with relatively free interchange among its parts is of fundamental importance to oceanography.

The major oceanic divisions are defined in part by the continents, various archipelagos, and other criteria. The principal divisions (in descending order of area) are the: Pacific Ocean, Atlantic Ocean, Indian Ocean, Southern (Antarctic) Ocean, and Arctic Ocean. Smaller regions of the oceans are called seas, gulfs, bays, straits, and other terms.

Geologically, an ocean is an area of oceanic crust covered by water. Oceanic crust is the thin layer of solidified volcanic basalt that covers the Earth's mantle. Continental crust is thicker but less dense. From this perspective, the Earth has three oceans: the World Ocean, the Caspian Sea, and the Black Sea. The latter two were formed by the collision of Cimmeria with Laurasia. The Mediterranean Sea is at times a discrete ocean because tectonic plate movement has repeatedly broken its connection to the World Ocean through the Strait of Gibraltar. The Black Sea is connected to the Mediterranean through the Bosporus, but the Bosporus is a natural canal cut through continental rock some 7,000 years ago, rather than a piece of oceanic sea floor like the Strait of Gibraltar.

Despite their names, some smaller landlocked "seas" are not connected with the World Ocean, such as the Caspian Sea (which is nevertheless, geologically, itself a full-fledged ocean—see above) and numerous salt lakes such as the Aral Sea.

A complete hierarchy showing which seas belong to which oceans, according to the International Hydrographic Organization (IHO), is available at the European Marine Gazetteer website. See also the list of seas article for the seas included in each ocean area. Also note there are many varying definitions of the world's seas and no single authority.

List of oceans
The world ocean is divided into a number of principal oceanic areas that are delimited by the continents and various oceanographic features: these divisions are the Atlantic Ocean, Arctic Ocean (sometimes considered an estuary of the Atlantic), Indian Ocean, Pacific Ocean, and the Southern Ocean, defined by the International Hydrographic Organization (IHO) in 2000, the latter being a relatively new addition identified with a distinct ecosystem and a unique impact on global climate. In turn, oceanic waters are interspersed by many smaller seas, gulfs, and bays.

If viewed from the southern pole of Earth, the Atlantic, Indian, and Pacific Oceans can be seen as lobes extending northward from the Southern Ocean. Farther north, the Atlantic opens into the Arctic Ocean, which is connected to the Pacific by the Bering Strait, forming a continuous expanse of water.

The five oceans are:
 The Pacific Ocean, the largest of the oceans, also reaches northward from the Southern Ocean to the Arctic Ocean. It spans the gap between Australia and Asia, and the Americas. The Pacific Ocean meets the Atlantic Ocean south of South America at Cape Horn.
 The Atlantic Ocean, the second largest, extends from the Southern Ocean between the Americas, and Africa and Europe, to the Arctic Ocean. The Atlantic Ocean meets the Indian Ocean south of Africa at Cape Agulhas.
 The Indian Ocean, the third largest, extends northward from the Southern Ocean to India, the Arabian Peninsula, and Southeast Asia in Asia, and between Africa in the west and Australia in the east. The Indian Ocean joins the Pacific Ocean to the east, near Australia.
 The Arctic Ocean is the smallest of the five. It joins the Atlantic Ocean near Greenland and Iceland and joins the Pacific Ocean at the Bering Strait. It overlies the North Pole, touching North America in the Western Hemisphere and Scandinavia and Siberia in the Eastern Hemisphere. The Arctic Ocean is partially covered in sea ice, the extent of which varies according to the season. 
 The Southern Ocean is a proposed ocean surrounding Antarctica, dominated by the Antarctic Circumpolar Current, generally the ocean south of 60 degrees south latitude. The Southern Ocean is partially covered in sea ice, the extent of which varies according to the season. The Southern Ocean is the second smallest of the five named oceans.

Arctic Ocean

The Arctic Ocean covers much of the Arctic and washes upon Northern America and Eurasia. It is sometimes considered a sea or estuary of the Atlantic Ocean.

The International Hydrographic Organization (IHO) defines the limits of the Arctic Ocean (excluding the seas it contains) as follows:Between Greenland and West Spitzbergen — The Northern limit of Greenland Sea.

Between West Spitzbergen and North East Land — the parallel of lat. 80° N.

From Cape Leigh Smith to Cape Kohlsaat — the Northern limit of Barentsz Sea.

From Cape Kohlsaat to Cape Molotov — the Northern limit of Kara Sea.

From Cape Molotov to the Northern extremity of Kotelni Island — the Northern limit of Laptev Sea.

From the Northern extremity of Kotelni Island to the Northern point of Wrangel Island — the Northern limit of East Siberian Sea.

From the Northern point of Wrangel Island to Point Barrow — the Northern limit of Chuckchi Sea.

From Point Barrow to Cape Land’s End on Prince Patrick Island — the Northern limit of Beaufort Sea, through the Northwest coast of Prince Patrick Island to Cape Leopold M’Clintock, thence to Cape Murray (Brook Island) and along the Northwest coast to the extreme Northerly point; to Cape Mackay (Borden Island); through the Northwesterly coast of Borden Island to Cape Malloch, to Cape Isachsen (Ellef Ringnes Island); to the Northwest point of Meighen Island to Cape Stallworthy (Axel Heiberg Island) to Cape Colgate the extreme West point of Ellesmere Island; through the North shore of Ellesmere Island to Cape Columbia thence a line to Cape Morris Jesup (Greenland).Note that these definitions exclude any marginal waterbodies that are separately defined by the IHO (such as the Kara Sea and East Siberian Sea), though these are usually considered to be part of the Arctic Ocean.

The CIA defines the limits of the Arctic Ocean differently, as depicted in the map comparing its definition to the IHO's definition.

Notes

Atlantic Ocean

The Atlantic Ocean separates the Americas from Europe and Africa. It may be further subdivided by the Equator into northern and southern portions.

North Atlantic Ocean
The 3rd edition, currently in force, of the International Hydrographic Organization's (IHO) Limits of Oceans and Seas defines the limits of the North Atlantic Ocean (excluding the seas it contains) as follows:On the West. The Eastern limits of the Caribbean Sea, the Southeastern limits of the Gulf of Mexico from the North coast of Cuba to Key West, the Southwestern limit of the Bay of Fundy and the Southeastern and Northeastern limits of the Gulf of St. Lawrence.

On the North. The Southern limit of Davis Strait from the coast of Labrador to Greenland and the Southwestern limit of the Greenland Sea and Norwegian Sea from Greenland to the Shetland Islands.

On the East. The Northwestern limit of the North Sea, the Northern and Western limits of the Scottish Seas, the Southern limit of the Irish Sea, the Western limits of the Bristol and English Channels, of the Bay of Biscay and of the Mediterranean Sea.

On the South. The equator, from the coast of Brazil to the Southwestern limit of the Gulf of Guinea.

South Atlantic Ocean
The 3rd edition (currently in force) of the International Hydrographic Organization's (IHO) Limits of Oceans and Seas defines the limits of the South Atlantic Ocean (excluding the seas it contains) as follows:On the Southwest. The meridian of Cape Horn, Chile (67°16'W) from Tierra del Fuego to the Antarctic Continent; a line from Cape Virgins to Cape Espiritu Santo, Tierra del Fuego, the Eastern entrance to Magellan Strait.

On the West. The limit of the Rio de La Plata.

On the North. The Southern limit of the North Atlantic Ocean.

On the Northeast. The limit of the Gulf of Guinea.

On the Southeast. From Cape Agulhas along the meridian of 20° East to the Antarctic continent.

On the South. The Antarctic Continent.Note that these definitions exclude any marginal waterbodies that are separately defined by the IHO (such as the Bay of Biscay and Gulf of Guinea), though these are usually considered to be part of the Atlantic Ocean.

In its 2002 draft, the IHO redefined the Atlantic Ocean, moving its southern limit to 60°S, with the waters south of that line identified as the Southern Ocean. This new definition has not yet been ratified (and, in addition, a reservation was lodged in 2003 by Australia.) While the name "Southern Ocean" is frequently used, some geographic authorities such as the 10th edition of the World Atlas from the U.S. National Geographic Society generally show the Atlantic, Indian, and Pacific Oceans continuing to Antarctica.  If and when adopted, the 2002 definition would be published in the 4th edition of Limits of Oceans and Seas, re-instituting the 2nd edition's "Southern Ocean", omitted from the 3rd edition.

Notes

Indian Ocean

The Indian Ocean washes upon southern Asia and separates Africa and Australia.

The 3rd edition, currently in force, of the International Hydrographic Organization's (IHO) Limits of Oceans and Seas defines the limits of the Indian Ocean (excluding the seas it contains) as follows:

On the North. The Southern limits of the Arabian Sea and the Lakshadweep Sea, the Southern limit of the Bay of Bengal, the Southern limits of the East Indian Archipelago, and the Southern limit of the Great Australian Bight.

On the West. From Cape Agulhas in 20° long. East, Southward along this meridian to the Antarctic Continent.

On the East. From South East Cape, the Southern point of Tasmania down the meridian 146°55'E to the Antarctic Continent.

On the South. The Antarctic Continent.

Note that this definition excludes any marginal waterbodies that are separately defined by the IHO (such as the Bay of Bengal and Arabian Sea), though these are usually considered to be part of the Indian Ocean.

In its 2002 draft, the IHO redefined the Indian Ocean, moving its southern limit to 60°S, with the waters south of that line identified as the Southern Ocean. This new definition has not yet been ratified (and, in addition, a reservation was lodged in 2003 by Australia.) While the name "Southern Ocean" is frequently used, some geographic authorities such as the 10th edition of the World Atlas from the U.S. National Geographic Society generally show the Atlantic, Indian, and Pacific Oceans continuing to Antarctica.  If and when adopted, the 2002 definition would be published in the 4th edition of Limits of Oceans and Seas, re-instituting the 2nd edition's "Southern Ocean", omitted from the 3rd edition.

The boundary of the Indian Ocean is a constitutional issue for Australia. The Imperial South Australia Colonisation Act, 1834, which established and defined the Colony of South Australia defined South Australia’s southern limit as being the “Southern Ocean.”   This definition was carried through to Australian constitutional law upon the Federation of Australia in 1901.

Notes

Pacific Ocean

The Pacific is the ocean that separates Asia and Australia from the Americas. It may be further subdivided by the Equator into northern and southern portions.

North Pacific Ocean
The 3rd edition, currently in force, of the International Hydrographic Organization's (IHO) Limits of Oceans and Seas defines the limits of the North Pacific Ocean (excluding the seas it contains) as follows:

On the Southwest. The Northeastern limit of the East Indian Archipelago from the Equator to Luzon Island.

On the West and Northwest. The Eastern limits of the Philippine Sea and Japan Sea and the Southeastern limit of the Sea of Okhotsk.

On the North. The Southern limits of the Bering Sea and the Gulf of Alaska.

On the East. The Western limit of Coastal waters of Southeast Alaska and Br. Columbia, and the Southern limit of the Gulf of California.

On the South. The Equator, but excluding those islands of the Gilbert and Galàpagos [sic] Groups which lie to the Northward thereof.

South Pacific Ocean
The 3rd edition, currently in force, of the International Hydrographic Organization's (IHO) Limits of Oceans and Seas defines the limits of the South Pacific Ocean (excluding the seas it contains) as follows:

On the West. From Southeast Cape, the Southern point of Tasmania, down the meridian of 146°55'E to the Antarctic continent.

On the Southwest and Northwest. The Southern, Eastern and Northeastern limits of the Tasman Sea, the Southeastern and Northeastern limits of the Coral Sea, the Southern, Eastern and Northern limits of the Solomon and Bismark seas, and the Northeastern limit of the East Indian Archipelago from New Guinea to the Equator.

On the North. The Equator, but including those islands of the Gilbert and Galàpagos [sic] Groups which lie to the Northward thereof.

On the East. The meridian of Cape Horn (67°16'W) from Tierra del Fuego to the Antarctic continent; a line from Cape Virgins to Cape Espiritu Santo, Tierra del Fuego, the Eastern entrance to Magellan Strait. (These limits have not yet been officially accepted by Argentina and Chile.)

On the South. The Antarctic continent.

Note that these definitions exclude any marginal waterbodies that are separately defined by the IHO (such as the Gulf of Alaska and Coral Sea), though these are usually considered to be part of the Pacific Ocean.

In its 2002 draft, the IHO redefined the Pacific Ocean, moving its southern limit to 60°S, with the waters south of that line identified as the Southern Ocean. This new definition has not yet been ratified (and, in addition, a reservation was lodged in 2003 by Australia.) While the name "Southern Ocean" is frequently used, some geographic authorities such as the 10th edition of the World Atlas from the U.S. National Geographic Society generally show the Atlantic, Indian, and Pacific Oceans continuing to Antarctica.  If and when adopted, the 2002 definition would be published in the 4th edition of Limits of Oceans and Seas, re-instituting the 2nd edition's "Southern Ocean", omitted from the 3rd edition.

Notes

Southern or Antarctic Ocean

The Southern Ocean contains the waters that surround Antarctica and sometimes is considered an extension of Pacific, Atlantic and Indian Oceans.

In 1928, the first edition of the International Hydrographic Organization's (IHO) Limits of Oceans and Seas publication included the Southern Ocean around Antarctica.  The Southern Ocean was delineated by land-based limits - the continent of Antarctica to the south, and the continents of South America, Africa, and Australia plus Broughton Island, New Zealand in the north. The detailed land-limits used were Cape Horn in South America, Cape Agulhas in Africa, the southern coast of Australia from Cape Leeuwin, Western Australia, to South East Cape, Tasmania, via the western edge of the water body of Bass Strait, and then Broughton Island before returning to Cape Horn.

The northern limits of the Southern Ocean were moved southwards in the IHO's 1937 second edition of the Limits of Oceans and Seas.  The Southern Ocean then extended from Antarctica northwards to latitude 40° south between Cape Agulhas in Africa (long. 20° east) and Cape Leeuwin in Western Australia (long. 115° east), and extended to latitude 55° south between Auckland Island of New Zealand (long. 165° or 166° east) and Cape Horn in South America (long. 67° west).

The Southern Ocean did not appear in the 1953 third edition because "...the northern limits ... are difficult to lay down owing to their seasonal change ... Hydrographic Offices who issue separate publications dealing with this area are therefore left to decide their own northern limits. (Great Britain uses the Latitude of 55° South)". Instead, in the IHO 1953 publication, the Atlantic, Indian and Pacific Oceans were extended southward, the Indian and Pacific Oceans (which had not previously touched pre 1953, as per the first and second editions) now abutted at the meridian of South East Cape, and the southern limits of the Great Australian Bight and the Tasman Sea were moved northwards.

The IHO readdressed the question of the Southern Ocean in a survey in 2000. Of its 68 member nations, 28 responded, and all responding members except Argentina agreed to redefine the ocean, reflecting the importance placed by oceanographers on ocean currents. The proposal for the name Southern Ocean won 18 votes, beating the alternative Antarctic Ocean. Half of the votes supported a definition of the ocean's northern limit at 60°S (with no land interruptions at this latitude), with the other 14 votes cast for other definitions, mostly 50°S, but a few for as far north as 35°S.

The 4th edition of Limits of Oceans and Seas has yet to be published due to 'areas of concern' by several countries relating to various naming issues around the world. The IHB circulated a new draft of the 4th edition of the publication in August 2002, however there were still various changes, 60 seas were added or renamed from the 3rd edition, and even the name of the publication was changed. A reservation had also been lodged by Australia regarding the Southern Ocean limits. Effectively, the 3rd edition (which did not delineate the Southern Ocean leaving delineation to local hydrographic offices) has yet to be superseded and IHO documents declare that it remains "currently in force."

Despite this, the 4th edition definition has de facto usage by many organisations, scientists and nations - even at times by IHO committees. Some nations' hydrographic offices have defined their own boundaries; the United Kingdom used the 55°S parallel for example.

Other sources, such as the National Geographic Society, show the Atlantic, Pacific and Indian Oceans as extending to Antarctica, although articles on the National Geographic web site have begun to reference the Southern Ocean.

In Australia, cartographic authorities defined the Southern Ocean as including the entire body of water between Antarctica and the south coasts of Australia and New Zealand. This delineation is basically the same as the original (first) edition of the IHO publication and effectively the same as the second edition. In the second edition, the Great Australian Bight was defined as the only geographical entity between the Australian coast and the Southern Ocean. Coastal maps of Tasmania and South Australia label the sea areas as Southern Ocean, while Cape Leeuwin in Western Australia is described as the point where the Indian and Southern Oceans meet.

See also

References

External links
 Limits of Oceans and Seas (Draft of the 4th edition, 2002)

Oceans
Oceans
Coastal geography
Oceans